Michael Jeffrey Shapiro is an American composer, conductor, and author.

The son of a Klezmer band clarinetist, Michael Shapiro spent most of his high school years in Baldwin, a Long Island suburb, where he was a music student of Consuelo Elsa Clark, William Zurcher, and Rudolf Bosakowski. The winner of several piano competitions during his youth, he earned his B.A. at Columbia College, Columbia University, where he majored in English literature and concentrated in music, benefiting most—according to his own assessment—from some of the department's stellar musicology faculty, which, at that time, included such international luminaries as Paul Henry Lang, Denis Stevens, Joel Newman, and others. He studied conducting independently with Carl Bamberger at the Mannes College of Music in New York and later with Harold Farberman at Bard College. At The Juilliard School, where he earned his master's degree, he studied solfège and score reading with the renowned Mme. Renée Longy—known to generations of Juilliard students as “the infamous madame of dictation” for her rigorous demands and classic pedagogic methods—and composition with Vincent Persichetti. His most influential composition teacher, however, was Elie Siegmeister, with whom he studied privately.

Shapiro is Laureate Conductor of the Chappaqua Orchestra in New York’s Westchester County, which he conducted for the world premiere of his score for the classic 1931 film Frankenstein (directed by James Whale and starring Boris Karloff) (which has since its premiere received over fifty productions internationally including the premiere of its operatic version at the LA Opera) as well as for the world premiere of his own orchestral work, Roller Coaster, which received its West Coast premiere under the baton of Marin Alsop in 2010 at the Cabrillo Festival of Contemporary Music while Shapiro was a composer in residence. He served for two years as the music consultant to the United States Holocaust Memorial Museum in Washington, D.C., where he produced and performed music by a number of composers who were either murdered by the Germans and their collaborators or had survived as refugees from the Third Reich. He has also been the assistant conductor at the Zurich Opera Studio.

Shapiro’s works, which span across all media, have been performed throughout the United States, Canada, and Europe, with broadcasts of premieres on the British Broadcasting Corporation, National Public Radio, the Canadian Broadcasting Corporation, the Israel Broadcasting Authority, Radio Television Ireland, Polskie Radio, Australian Broadcasting Corporation, Fine Music Radio South Africa, SiriusXM Symphony Hall Living American and Vincent Caruso's Classics on Film, and WCBS-TV. His music has been characterized in a New York Times review as “possessing a rare melodic gift.” His oeuvre includes more than one hundred works for solo voice, piano, chamber ensembles, chorus, orchestra, as well as for opera, film, and television.

Shapiro has received awards and grants from Martha Baird Rockefeller Composer's Assistance, Meet the Composer, the Henry Evans Traveling Fellowship of Columbia University, and the Boris Koutzen Memorial Fund. He has also received the Columbian Award and the Sigma Alpha Iota Composers Competition prize. He is the author of the novel Getting In, and two non-fiction books about Jewish culture and history, Jewish Pride and The Jewish 100, which has been published in British, Japanese, Chinese, Russian, Portuguese, Bulgarian, Polish, and Romanian editions—in addition to its original American release.

Shapiro has collaborated with such artists as Teresa Stratas, Jose Ferrer, Janos Starker, Sir Malcolm Arnold with whom Shapiro studied briefly, John Corigliano, Marin Alsop, Paul Shaffer, Sergiu Comissiona, Jerry Junkin, Eugene Drucker, Brad Lubman, Kim Cattrall, Tim Fain, Lara Downes, Gottfried Wagner, Alexis Cole, Edward Arron, Jerome Rose, Mariko Anraku, Steven Beck, Elliott Forrest, Ariadne Greif, Deborah Simpkin King, Daniel Mutlu, John Fullam, Jose Ramos Santana, Clamma Dale, Anita Darian, Megan Moore, Gregory Feldmann, Florence Levitt, Nina Berman, Kikuei Ikeda, Ayako Yoshida, Harris Poor, John Edward Niles, David Leibowitz, Robert Tomaro, Kathryn Amyotte, James Allen Anderson, Sarah McKoin, Albert Nguyen, Captain Kenneth Collins, Lawrence Golan, Jeffery Meyer, David Kehler, Kevin Suetterlin, Matthias Elmer, Andrey Litvinenko, Nadya Potemkina, Jeffrey Boeckman, Carter Biggars, Daniel Kocurek, Alexandra Guerin, Christopher Lee Morehouse, Glen Hemberger, Anthony LaGruth, Matthew Thomas Troy, Daniel Belongia, and Emily Wong, and organizations such as the Los Angeles Opera, BBC National Orchestra of Wales, City of Birmingham Symphony Orchestra, Houston Symphony Orchestra, Orchestra Sinfonica di Milano Giuseppe Verdi, Virginia Symphony Orchestra, Charleston Symphony Orchestra, United States Navy Band, West Point Band's The Jazz Knights, Dallas Winds, Orquesta Sinfonica de Puerto Rico, Springfield Symphony Orchestra, Traverse Symphony Orchestra, Philharmonisches Orchester der Stadt Trier, New York Repertory Orchestra, Remix Ensemble at the Casa da Musica, Strings Music Festival, York Symphony Orchestra, Yakima Symphony Orchestra, Beloit-Janesville Symphony, Dragefjetts Musikkorps, Royal Canadian Air Force Band, St. Petersburg (Russia) Chamber Philharmonic, Garden State Philharmonic, Opera Theatre of Northern Virginia, Piedmont Wind Symphony, Ember Choral Arts, American Modern Ensemble, Westchester Concert Singers, International Opera Center at the Zurich Opera, United States Holocaust Memorial Museum, American Jewish Committee, Hawthorne String Quartet, Locrian Chamber Ensemble, Amernet String Quartet, Artemis, Cabrillo Festival of Contemporary Music, Bergen International Festival, Central Synagogue (Manhattan), Temple Shaaray Tefila of Northern Westchester, and Dateline NBC, and universities in New York, Louisiana, Ohio, Delaware, Florida, Kentucky, Texas, Nebraska, Massachusetts, Minnesota, Arizona, Georgia, Hawaii, Oregon, California, Connecticut, Colorado, Indiana, and Tennessee.

Selected works
 He has written in every form including operas, symphonies, concerti, chamber music for various combinations, choral music, solo piano works, and six song cycles.

Opera
The Love of Don Perlimplin and Belisa in the Garden, libretto by Michael Shapiro based on the play by Federico García Lorca - a one-act opera written in 1984 and premiered by the Opera Theatre of Northern Virginia, John Edward Niles, conductor, Darko Tresnjak, stage director.
Frankenstein-The Movie Opera, soprano, mezzo-soprano, tenor, baritone, bass, and chamber orchestra (text the Latin Requiem Mass), premiered at the LA Opera.
The Slave, based on the novel by Isaac Bashevis Singer - a two act opera (in preparation)(libretto by Hannah McDermott)

Film scores
American Jewish Committee documentary
Distant Relatives - Israel Broadcasting Authority
Frankenstein-The Movie Score directed by James Whale starring Boris Karloff premiered at the Jacob Burns Film Center by The Chappaqua Orchestra - four versions for fifteen player ensemble, full orchestra, wind ensemble, choral and operatic forces

Symphonies
Symphony Pomes Penyeach based on the poems of James Joyce
Second Symphony, recorded by the City of Birmingham Symphony Orchestra

Orchestra
A Declaration of Independence, July 4, 1776 for narrator and orchestra, premiered by Jose Ferrer, narrator, Philharmonic Symphony Orchestra of Westchester, Martin Rich, conductor, during the Bicentennial
Lyric Variations for chamber orchestra
like the roaring sea for orchestra
Frankenstein-The Overture, recorded by the City of Birmingham Symphony Orchestra
Frankenstein-The Movie Score (two orchestral versions - chamber ensemble (15 players) and full orchestra)
The Headless Horseman for narrator and orchestra
Perlimplinito, Opera Sweet, a lace paper valentine for orchestra, premiered by the Opera Theatre of Northern Virginia, John Edward Niles, conductor, and recorded by the BBC National Orchestra of Wales
Widorama! for orchestra, recorded by the BBC National Orchestra of Wales
Roller Coaster for orchestra, premiered by the Cabrillo Festival of Contemporary Music Orchestra, Marin Alsop, conductor, and recorded by the BBC National Orchestra of Wales
The Babbling Orchestra for narrator and orchestra

Band
Roller Coaster for band
Widorama! for band, premiered by Jerry Junkin conducting the Dallas Winds
Frankenstein-The Overture for wind ensemble
Frankenstein-The Movie Score for wind ensemble, premiered by Michael Shapiro conducting the Dallas Winds
Bamboula for band, premiered by Matthew Thomas Troy conducting the Piedmont Wind Symphony
A Declaration of Independence, July 4, 1776 for narrator and band
Ol' Mississippi Sings the Blues for band, dedicated to Blind Mississippi Morris and premiered by Albert Nguyen conducting the University of Memphis Wind Ensemble, and David Kehler conducting the Kennesaw State University Wind Ensemble
In Every One for band
American Interludes for band

Concerti
Sinfonia Concertante for violin, violoncello, and orchestra
Concerto for guitar and strings, premiered by David Tanenbaum, guitar, and the New Jersey Festival Orchestra, Brad Keimach, conductor
Concerto for harp and strings
Archangel Concerto for piano and orchestra, premiered by Steven Beck, piano, and Michael Shapiro conducting the BBC National Orchestra of Wales
At the Shore of the Sea, Concerto for violin and orchestra
In the Light of the Sun, Concerto for flute and orchestra

Chamber
String Quartet (Yiddish), premiered by the Hawthorne String Quartet
Piano Quintet, premiered by the Locrian Chamber Ensemble
Sonata No. 1 for Violin and Piano
Sonata No. 2 for Violin and Piano, premiered and recorded by Tim Fain, violin, and Steven Beck, piano
Sonata for Clarinet and Piano, premiered by John Fullam, clarinet, and Michael Shapiro, piano
Sextet for Piano and Winds
Shir for Flute and Piano
Yiddishkeit for Clarinet and Piano (alt. Violin and Piano or Cello and Piano)
Musical Chairs for brass quintet (French Horn, two trumpets, trombone, and tuba) premierede Sun,  by the Dallas Winds
American Realists for Clarinet, Violin, Cello, and Piano
Watching the Students Grow for two Flutes and Piano

Solo Instrumental
Eliahu Hanavi Variations - for solo violoncello, recorded by Sato Knudsen (Boston Symphony Orchestra)
Peace Variations- for solo violin, recorded by Tim Fain
Kaddish-Berakhot-Nigun - for solo flute

Piano
Five Preludes
Mysteries
Sonata No. 1
Sonata No. 2, premiered by Jerome Rose at the Phillips Collection, Washington, D.C.
Bitter(sweet) Waltzes
Passages
Creation
Babel
In the Wilderness
Hannah
A Light
Ruth
Naso
The Deluge
Hineni! (Here I Stand!)
American Interludes, dedicated to Lara Downes
Calming
Tending
In Every One

Choral
Three Psalms (SSAA a capella)
Psalm 137 (SATB and organ)
Three Shakespeare Madrigals (SATB a capella)
There is that in me (Walt Whitman) (SATB and ensemble)
Spanish Medieval Lyrics (SSATB a capella)
Voices based on Sephardic poetry of the Holocaust (soprano soloist, SATB, and chamber ensemble), oratorio in eight movements, premiered and recorded by Daniel Mutlu, Ember Choral Arts, American Modern Ensemble, Deborah Simpkin King
In Paradisum(SATBariB and ensemble)
Cultivo una rosa blanca (Jose Marti) (SATB and piano)

Song cycles
Canciones, poetry by Federico García Lorca, premiered by Clamma Dale and recorded by Ariadne Greif
Dublin Songs, poetry by James Joyce, premiered by Florence Levitt and recorded by Ariadne Grief
Songs for American Poets, poetry by Walt Whitman, Teton Sioux, Carl Sandburg, premiered by Harris Poor
Wordsworth Songs, poetry by William Wordsworth, premiered by Katherine Ciesinski and Jerome Rose
Erotic Songs, poetry by Erica Jong and Denise Levertov
A Child's Garden, poetry by Robert Louis Stevenson (from A Child's Garden of Verses)
Whitman Songs, poetry by Walt Whitman

Recordings
Recordings include:
Eliahu Hanavi Variations - Sato Knudsen ('cello) (Naxos Records, Milken Archive of Jewish American Music)
Variation - Peace Variations - Tim Fain (violin) and Eliahu Hanavi Variations - Sato Knudsen ('cello) (Paumanok Records)
Second Symphony, City of Birmingham Symphony Orchestra, Michael Shapiro, conductor (Paumanok Records)
Overture to Frankenstein-The Movie Score, City of Birmingham Symphony Orchestra, Michael Shapiro, conductor (Paumanok Records)
Second Sonata for Violin and Piano, Tim Fain (violin) and Steven Beck (piano) (Paumanok Records)
Archangel Concerto for Piano and Orchestra, Steven Beck (piano), BBC National Orchestra of Wales, Michael Shapiro, conductor (Paumanok Records)
Roller Coaster, BBC National Orchestra of Wales, Michael Shapiro, conductor (Paumanok Records)
 Perlimplinito, Opera Sweet, A Lace Paper Valentine for orchestra, BBC National Orchestra of Wales, Michael Shapiro, conductor (Paumanok Records)
Widorama!, BBC National Orchestra of Wales, Michael Shapiro, conductor (Paumanok Records)
Michael's Songbook, Vol. I, Ariadne Greif, soprano, Michael Shapiro, piano (recordings of Canciones and Dublin Songs) (Paumanok Records)
Passages, Interludes, and Bitter(Sweet) Waltzes, Steven Beck, piano (Paumanok Records)
Voices, Daniel Mutlu, tenor, Ember Choral Arts, American Modern Ensemble, Deborah Simpkin King, conductor (Paumanok Records)

References
 ASCAP Biographical Dictionary, R. Bowker LLC (January 1981)

External links
 http://www.newmusicbox.org
 http://www.milkenarchive.org/people/view/composers/626/Shapiro%2C+Michael
 https://web.archive.org/web/20100916052115/http://www.cabrillomusic.org/2010-season/composers-2010/michael-shapiro.html
 http://vagnethierry.fr/contemporary-operas.html

American male composers
21st-century American composers
Jewish American classical musicians
Living people
Pupils of Vincent Persichetti
21st-century American male musicians
Columbia College (New York) alumni
21st-century American Jews
Year of birth missing (living people)